Frederick Norton Cook DSC (20 February 1905 – 1 August 1985), usually known as F. N. Cook was an officer of the Royal Australian Navy. Cook came to be regarded as an expert in the deployment of landing craft, following his experience with them in both the North West European theatre and the Pacific theatre. Cook achieved the rank of Captain.

During 1942 he led landing craft in the Raid on Bruneval, in German-occupied France, for which he was awarded the Distinguished Service Cross. Due to his experience with training combined forces and his success at Bruneval, Cook was recalled to Australia to command the Amphibious Training Centre at HMAS Assault (Port Stephens).

References

External links
 Naval Historical Society of Australia, 1999—2014, On This Day, 68 30 January 2014.
 Navy Office, 2004, COOK FREDERICK NORTON 30 January 2014.
 Navy Office, 1987, Officers (RAN) personal record - Frederick Norton Cook 30 January 2014.

1905 births
1985 deaths
Royal Australian Navy officers
Royal Australian Navy personnel of World War II
Recipients of the Distinguished Service Cross (United Kingdom)